Curtis Marsh may refer to:

Curtis Marsh Sr. (born 1970), American football wide receiver for the Jacksonville Jaguars, Pittsburgh Steelers, and Saskatchewan Roughriders, father of the latter
Curtis Marsh Jr. (born 1988), American football cornerback for the Philadelphia Eagles, son of the former
Curtis Marsh (boxer) from Herol Graham